The following is a list of transfers and squad changes for the 2021–22 I-League. The list includes both pre-season and mid-season transfers.

Gokulam Kerala FC

Transfers in

Transfers out

Churchill Brothers

In

Out

Sudeva Delhi

Transfers In

Transfers Out

Round Glass Punjab

In

Out

Real Kashmir

Transfers in

Transfers out

NEROCA

Transfers in

Loans in

Transfers out

TRAU

Transfers in

Transfers out

Aizawl

In

Loans in

Out

Loans Out

Sreenidi Deccan

Transfers in

References

2021–22 I-League